North Grove can refer to:

 North Grove, Indiana, United States, an unincorporated community
 North Grove, Saskatchewan, Canada, a resort village